Compound Document Format (CDF) is a set of W3C candidate standards describing electronic compound document file formats that contains multiple formats, such as SVG, XHTML, SMIL and XForms.
The core standards are the Web Integration Compound Document and the Compound Document by Reference Framework (CDR). As of August 19, 2010, the Compound Document Format working group has been closed, and W3C's development of the standard discontinued.

See also
Electronic prescribing
Compound File Binary Format

References

External links
Official website
ARS Technica Feature
The Standards blog "Putting the OpenDocument Foundation to Bed (without its supper)"
Marbux "Putting Andy Updegrove to Bed (without his supper)", Setting the Record Straight - Universal Interoperability Council, 6 February 2008

Markup languages
Open formats
Computer file formats